The 2014 Croatian Football Super Cup was the eleventh edition of Croatian Football Super Cup, a football match contested by the winners of the Croatian First League and Croatian Football Cup competitions. The match was played on  11 July 2014 at Stadion Kantrida in Rijeka between 2013–14 Croatian First League winners Dinamo Zagreb and 2013–14 Croatian Football Cup winners Rijeka.

Match details

References 

 2013 Croatian Football Super Cup at HRnogomet.com

2014
GNK Dinamo Zagreb matches
HNK Rijeka matches
Supercup